The Czechoslovakia national under-21 football team was the national football team for the under-21s of Czechoslovakia, before the country split into the Czech Republic and Slovakia (For information about the national teams of the two countries, see the articles Czech Republic national under-21 football team and Slovakia national under-21 football team.)

Following the realignment of UEFA's youth competitions in 1976, Czechoslovakia's Under-21 team was formed.  Despite the end of the country in January 1993, the team played until March 1994, fulfilling its fixtures in the UEFA U-21 Championship as a combined team.  Since the under-21 competition rules state that players must be 21 or under at the start of a two-year competition, technically it is an U-23 competition.   Czechoslovakia's record for the preceding U-23 competitions is also shown.

In its twelve U-23 and U-21 competitions, the team had a decent record, winning the first competition in 1972 and reaching the quarter-finals on seven occasions.  The team failed to qualify for the final eight on four occasions.

UEFA U-23 Championship Record 
Czechoslovakia were randomly chosen to play holders Bulgaria for the title, which they did not win.  The competition was abandoned in summer 1970 for a larger competition, Czechoslovakia's next competitive match was in qualification for that competition, which ended in 1972 with them as champions.

 November 15, 1967: Bulgaria 2-1 Czechoslovakia
 1972: Champions.
 1974: Losing quarter-finalists.
 1976: Did not qualify. Finished 3rd of 3 in qualification group.

UEFA U-21 Championship Record 
 1978: Losing quarter-finalists.
 1980: Losing quarter-finalists.
 1982: Did not qualify. Finished 2nd of 3 in qualification group.
 1984: Did not qualify. Finished 2nd of 4 in qualification group.
 1986: Did not qualify. Finished 3rd of 4 in qualification group.
 1988: Losing quarter-finalists.
 1990: Losing quarter-finalists.
 1992: Losing quarter-finalists.
 1994: Losing quarter-finalists.

See also 
 European Under-21 Football Championship

External links
 UEFA Under-21 website Contains full results archive
 The Rec.Sport.Soccer Statistics Foundation Contains full record of U-21/U-23 Championships.

European national under-21 association football teams
under-21